Buu may refer to:

 Majin Buu, alternate spelling for Majin Boo, a character in Dragon Ball
 Muara Bungo Airport IATA code
 Burlington Municipal Airport (Wisconsin)'s FAA identifier
 Budu language's ISO 639-3 code
 Burapha University

People with the name
 Buu Hoi (1915-1972), Vietnamese diplomat and cancer researcher

See also 
  
 BU (disambiguation)
 Boo (disambiguation)